Malgudi Days is a 2020 Indian Kannada-language drama film written and directed by Kishore Moodbidri, and produced by K Rathnakar Kamath. Starring Vijay Raghavendra, Greeshma Shridar, with a music score by Gagan Baderiya, it was released in India on 7 February 2020.

Plot
Writer Lakshmi Narayana Malgudi, (Vijay Raghavendra) a well-known writer, has announced his retirement from writing and his fans are heartbroken. The man, who lived his entire life creating wonderful memories for his readers, carries around a heavy heart but refuses to share with anyone the reason behind it. While his family suggests that he settle in a foreign land, Malgudi has other plans. He decides to go back to the place where he spent his childhood - Malgudi. Prakruti (Greeshma), who has quit her job after reporting workplace harassment, is on the way to find herself. The two meet into each other and begin a journey together. En route, they narrate their stories to each other. In the flashback (the late 70s), Malgudi (a Hindu boy), a studious student of Class 10, falls in love with Lenita (a Christian girl) who is mute. Her father, a cop, is recently transferred to Malgudi and the family is still in the process of settling down. Malgudi's love for Lenita doubles when he finds out she is mute. Amidst all this, communal tension breaks out between Hindus and Christians in the town. While Lenita reciprocates Malgudi's love, miscreants blame Lenita's family for indulging in conversion. As the tension intensifies, Malgudi flees to Bengaluru. Forty years later, still in love with Lenita, he enters Malgudi with the hope of meeting her.

Cast 

 Vijay Raghavendra as Lakshmi Narayana Malgudi in short Malgudi
  Greeshma Sridhar as Prakruti
 Arjun Kapikad as Vijay
 Dhanaraj Cm
 Tejaswini

Production
The film, despite its title, is not based on the short story collection by R. K. Narayan.

Soundtrack

Greeshma Shridar composed the music There are eight songs.

Home media 
The film was made available to stream on OTT platform Amazon Prime on 8 March 2020.

Reception
Reviewing Malgudi Days for The Times of India Tanvi PS gave three points five stars from five

References

External links

2020 films
Films shot in Bangalore
Films shot in Karnataka
2020s Kannada-language films
Indian drama films
2020 drama films